Sławomir Nazaruk (born February 6, 1975 in Parczew) is a retired Polish footballer and current assistant manager of Stal Rzeszów.

Career

Club
He announced his retirement on 30 May 2011.

References

External links
 
 Sławomir Nazaruk at Footballdatabase

Polish footballers
1975 births
Living people
Wisła Płock players
Widzew Łódź players
Górnik Łęczna players
Śląsk Wrocław players
People from Parczew County
Sportspeople from Lublin Voivodeship
Association football midfielders